Edward Bruce Pitblado (23 February 1896 – 2 December 1977) was a British Canadian ice hockey player who competed in the 1924 Winter Olympics for the United Kingdom.

Born in Winnipeg, Manitoba, Pitblado graduated from the University of Manitoba in 1920. His father, prominent lawyer Isaac Pitblado, was the chairman of the board of governors at the university from 1917 to 1924, and also was co-prosecutor of the seditious conspirators in the Winnipeg General Strike.

After working briefly for his father's law firm, Pitblado went to the University of Oxford in 1922 on a Rhodes Scholarship. After being part of the 1924 British ice hockey team, he returned to Manitoba and received a law degree from the University of Manitoba in 1926.

Pitblado had a long and distinguished legal career, serving as president of the Law Society of Manitoba (1965-6). He was one of the incorporators of the University of Manitoba Alumni Association and served as president from 1929 to 1931. He was president of the Manitoba Fish and Game Association in 1935, and helped found the Canadian branch of Ducks Unlimited, serving as secretary of the organization from 1938 to 1974.

In 1928, he married Esther Jonsson, daughter of Reverend B. B. Jonsson. They had two children: James Pitblado and Janice Pitblado. He died at Winnipeg on 2 December 1977 and was buried in Elmwood Cemetery.

External links
Olympic profile

References

1896 births
1977 deaths
Canadian ice hockey players
Ice hockey people from Winnipeg
Ice hockey players at the 1924 Winter Olympics
Medalists at the 1924 Winter Olympics
Olympic bronze medallists for Great Britain
Olympic ice hockey players of Great Britain
Olympic medalists in ice hockey
Robson Hall alumni
Canadian Rhodes Scholars